Yuri (Yury) Kudinov (born 27 February 1979, in Volgograd) is a long-distance swimmer from Russia.

In 2007 he narrowly missed the world record for the fastest swim across the English Channel when he was beaten by Petar Stoychev. His time of  remains one of the fastest swims ever recorded, but was not enough to beat Stoychev's  set on the same day (24 August 2007).

He swam for the Kazakhstan National Team at the 2012 Summer Olympics.

See also
 World Open Water Championships – Multiple medalists

References

1979 births
Living people
Male long-distance swimmers
Russian male long-distance swimmers
English Channel swimmers
Kazakhstani male long-distance swimmers
Russian expatriate sportspeople in Kazakhstan
Olympic swimmers of Kazakhstan
Swimmers at the 2012 Summer Olympics
World Aquatics Championships medalists in open water swimming
Sportspeople from Volgograd
20th-century Russian people
21st-century Russian people